Amor Chiquito is the fourth album released by Mexican rock band Fobia on December 22, 1995. Of previous albums, "Amor Chiquito" possesses a broader range of melodies, from Hard Rock tunes ("Revolución sin manos", "Descontrol"), to more melodic themes ("Hipnotízame", "Vivo"), to pop songs like "Sin querer". Fobia's signature sound does not change, staying true to its eclectic lyrics full of surreal imagery.
Ten more years would pass before Fobia would sit together again to record another LP.

The band
 Paco Huidobro: Guitars, Chorus
 Leonardo de Lozanne: Vocals, Chorus
 Iñaki: Keyboards, Programming, Chorus
 Cha!: Bass

Guest artists
 Jorge Amaro "Chiquis": Drums, Percussions
 Jay de la Cueva: Drums, Percussions

Track listing
 Revolución Sin Manos
 Descontrol
 Vestida Para Matar
 Hipnotízame
 Ai Kan Bugui
 Veneno Vil
 Mira Teté (Mientras Más Fumo, Más Te Quiero)
 Sin Querer
 Casi Amor
 Vivo
 Casa Vacía
 Estrellas En La Panza

1995 albums
Fobia albums